John Henry Thomas Manners-Sutton, 3rd Viscount Canterbury  (27 May 1814 – 24 June 1877), styled The Hon. John Manners-Sutton between 1814 and 1866 and Sir John Manners-Sutton between 1866 and 1869, was a British Tory politician and colonial administrator.

Background and education
A member of the Manners family headed by the Duke of Rutland, Manners-Sutton was born at Downing Street, London, the second and youngest son of Charles Manners-Sutton, 1st Viscount Canterbury, Speaker of the House of Commons, by his first wife Lucy, daughter of John Denison. His mother died when he was one year old. He was educated at Eton and Trinity College, Cambridge, graduating with an MA in 1835. In his youth he played first-class cricket for Cambridge University Cricket Club and Marylebone Cricket Club.

Political career
Manners-Sutton was returned to Parliament for Cambridge in September 1839. However, in April 1840 his election was declared void. He was returned for the same constituency in 1841 and held it until 1847. He served as Under-Secretary of State for the Home Department from 1841 to 1846 in Sir Robert Peel's second administration.

Colonial governor
In 1854 Manners-Sutton was appointed Lieutenant Governor of New Brunswick, a post he held until 1861. He later served as Governor of Trinidad from 1864 to 1866 and as Governor of Victoria from 1866 to 1873. He was appointed a Knight Commander of the Order of the Bath in 1866 and a Knight Grand Cross of the Order of St Michael and St George in 1873. In 1869 he succeeded in the viscountcy of Canterbury on the death of his unmarried elder brother.

Family
He married, on 5 July 1838, Georgiana, youngest daughter of Charles Tompson of Witchingham Hall, Norfolk, by whom he had five sons, and two daughters:
 Henry Charles, who succeeded him as Viscount Canterbury; 
 Graham Edward Henry, who died 30 May 1888 ; 
 George Kett Henry, who died 2 March 1865 ; 
 John Gurney Henry,
 Robert Henry, who was called to the bar at the Inner Temple on 7 May 1879 
 Anna Maria Georgiana, who married, on 25 August 1868, Charles Edward Bright, C.M.G., of Toorak, Australia;
 Mabel Georgiana.

Legacy
Sutton street in the southern Ballarat suburb of Redan is named after him.

References

External links 
 

Governors of British Trinidad
Governors of Victoria (Australia)
Governors of the Colony of New Brunswick
Manners-Sutton, John
Knights Commander of the Order of the Bath
Knights Grand Cross of the Order of St Michael and St George
Viscounts in the Peerage of the United Kingdom
1814 births
1877 deaths
People educated at Eton College
Alumni of Trinity College, Cambridge
Manners-Sutton, John
UK MPs who inherited peerages
Conservative Party (UK) hereditary peers
John
English cricketers
Cambridge University cricketers
Marylebone Cricket Club cricketers
English cricketers of 1826 to 1863
Colony of Victoria people